

This is a list of the National Register of Historic Places listings in Sevier County, Arkansas.

This is intended to be a complete list of the properties on the National Register of Historic Places in Sevier County, Arkansas, United States. The locations of National Register properties for which the latitude and longitude coordinates are included below, may be seen in a map.

There are 16 properties listed on the National Register in the county. Two sites that were once listed have been removed.

Current listings

|}

Former listings

|}

See also

List of National Historic Landmarks in Arkansas
National Register of Historic Places listings in Arkansas

References

 
Sevier County